Yuju may refer to:

Henan opera, a Chinese opera form
Yuju (singer), South Korean singer
You Province, known in Korean as Yuju, a province in Chinese history which administered parts of North Korea and Manchuria in some periods